The Gaza envelope (Otef Aza) is  the populated areas of Israel that are within  of the Gaza Strip border and are therefore within range of mortar shells and Qassam rockets launched from the Gaza Strip. The region is populated by 70,000 Israeli citizens according to the Israeli ministry of internal affairs.

History

Following the Israeli withdrawal from the Gaza Strip in 2005, there was an increase in cross-border shelling and rocket attacks into Israel. Data collected by the Israeli Security Agency showed an increase in shelling from 401 shells in 2005 rising year-on-year to 2,048 in 2008 before falling back to 569 in 2009. In response to the increase in shelling, in 2007 the Knesset passed the "Assistance to Sderot and the Western Negev (Temporary Provision) Law, 2007", which recognized these communities (and additional communities in the area designated by the Minister of Finance's order) as "Confrontation-line Communities" and gave them special privileges (temporarily, until the end of 2008). Additional legislative measures extended the validity of some of the benefits, with certain changes, until the end of 2014. This area came to be known colloquially as the "Gaza envelope."

Gaza envelope communities
The following communities were included in the list of communities in southern confrontation line area, published by the Israel Tax Authority:

See also
Gaza–Israel barrier

References

 
Gaza–Israel conflict
Regions of Israel